League tables for teams participating in Kolmonen, the fourth tier of the Finnish soccer league system, in 2020. A total of 108 teams compete in the 2020 campaign, split into 9 groupd based on regional locations.

League tables

Kaakkois-Suomen

Itä AC

Etelä A

Etelä B

Itä B

Keski-Pohjanmaa ja Vaasa

Pohjois-Suomen

Tampereen

Länsi Suomen

References and sources
Finnish FA
Kolmonen (jalkapallo) 

Kolmonen seasons
4
Finland
Finland